Bonaventure Airport  is located  northeast of Bonaventure, Quebec, Canada.

Airlines and destinations

References

Certified airports in Gaspésie–Îles-de-la-Madeleine